Prince of Light may refer to:
 Prince of Light, a title of Saint Michael the Archangel
Ramayana: The Legend of Prince Rama, a 1992 Indo-Japanese animated film

See also
 Prince of Darkness (disambiguation)